The False Alarms is the third studio album by American electro-pop group Fol Chen. It was released by Asthmatic Kitty Records on March 19, 2013.

Reception
At Metacritic, which assigns a weighted average score out of 100 to reviews from mainstream critics, The False Alarms received an average score of 70% based on 9 reviews, indicating "generally favorable reviews".

Zach Kelly of Pitchfork Media gave The False Alarms a 6.9 out of 10, saying: "Detours into coldwave and seance-y Scandi-pop still feel like an attempt to steer things in a new direction, but the songs fall prey to the same kind of directionless, inertia-deprived trappings that helped sink Fol Chen's previous records." Heather Phares of AllMusic said, "these songs are somewhat less enigmatic than before: the melodies are ever so slightly more direct, even though intricate arrangements and hooks that sneak up on the listener are still what make this band distinctive."

Track listing

References

External links

2013 albums
Fol Chen albums
Asthmatic Kitty albums